Probability is a measure of the likeliness that an event will occur. Probability is used to quantify an attitude of mind towards some proposition whose truth is not certain. The proposition of interest is usually of the form "A specific event will occur." The attitude of mind is of the form "How certain is it that the event will occur?" The certainty that is adopted can be described in terms of a numerical measure, and this number, between 0 and 1 (where 0 indicates impossibility and 1 indicates certainty) is called the probability. Probability theory is used extensively in statistics, mathematics, science and philosophy to draw conclusions about the likelihood of potential events and the underlying mechanics of complex systems.

Introduction
 Probability and randomness.

Basic probability
(Related topics: set theory, simple theorems in the algebra of sets)

Events
 Events in probability theory
 Elementary events, sample spaces, Venn diagrams
 Mutual exclusivity

Elementary probability
 The axioms of probability
 Boole's inequality

Meaning of probability
 Probability interpretations
 Bayesian probability
 Frequency probability

Calculating with probabilities
 Conditional probability
 The law of total probability
 Bayes' theorem

Independence
 Independence (probability theory)

Probability theory
(Related topics: measure theory)

Measure-theoretic probability
 Sample spaces, σ-algebras and probability measures
 Probability space
 Sample space
 Standard probability space
 Random element
 Random compact set
 Dynkin system
 Probability axioms
 Event (probability theory)
 Complementary event
 Elementary event
 "Almost surely"

Independence
 Independence (probability theory)
 The Borel–Cantelli lemmas and Kolmogorov's zero–one law

Conditional probability
 Conditional probability
 Conditioning (probability)
 Conditional expectation
 Conditional probability distribution
 Regular conditional probability
 Disintegration theorem
 Bayes' theorem
 Rule of succession
 Conditional independence
 Conditional event algebra
 Goodman–Nguyen–van Fraassen algebra

Random variables

Discrete and continuous random variables
 Discrete random variables: Probability mass functions
 Continuous random variables: Probability density functions
 Normalizing constants
 Cumulative distribution functions
 Joint, marginal and conditional distributions

Expectation
 Expectation (or mean), variance and covariance
 Jensen's inequality
 General moments about the mean
 Correlated and uncorrelated random variables
 Conditional expectation:
 law of total expectation, law of total variance
 Fatou's lemma and the monotone and dominated convergence theorems
 Markov's inequality and Chebyshev's inequality

Independence
 Independent random variables

Some common distributions
 Discrete:
 constant (see also degenerate distribution),
 Bernoulli and binomial,
 negative binomial,
 (discrete) uniform,
 geometric,
 Poisson, and
 hypergeometric.
 Continuous:
 (continuous) uniform,
 exponential,
 gamma,
 beta,
 normal (or Gaussian) and multivariate normal,
 χ-squared (or chi-squared),
 F-distribution,
 Student's t-distribution, and
 Cauchy.

Some other distributions
 Cantor
 Fisher–Tippett (or Gumbel)
 Pareto
 Benford's law

Functions of random variables
 Sum of normally distributed random variables
 Borel's paradox

Generating functions
(Related topics: integral transforms)

Common generating functions
 Probability-generating functions
 Moment-generating functions
 Laplace transforms and Laplace–Stieltjes transforms
 Characteristic functions

Applications
 A proof of the central limit theorem

Convergence of random variables
(Related topics: convergence)

Modes of convergence
 Convergence in distribution and convergence in probability,
 Convergence in mean, mean square and rth mean
 Almost sure convergence
 Skorokhod's representation theorem

Applications
 Central limit theorem and Laws of large numbers
 Illustration of the central limit theorem and a 'concrete' illustration
 Berry–Esséen theorem
 Law of the iterated logarithm

Stochastic processes

Some common stochastic processes
 Random walk
 Poisson process
 Compound Poisson process
 Wiener process
 Geometric Brownian motion
 Fractional Brownian motion
 Brownian bridge
 Ornstein–Uhlenbeck process
 Gamma process

Markov processes
 Markov property
 Branching process
 Galton–Watson process
 Markov chain
 Examples of Markov chains
 Population processes
 Applications to queueing theory
 Erlang distribution

Stochastic differential equations
 Stochastic calculus
 Diffusions
 Brownian motion
 Wiener equation
 Wiener process

Time series
 Moving-average and autoregressive processes
 Correlation function and autocorrelation

Martingales
 Martingale central limit theorem
 Azuma's inequality

See also
 Catalog of articles in probability theory
 Glossary of probability and statistics
 Notation in probability and statistics
 List of mathematical probabilists
 List of probability distributions
 List of probability topics
 List of scientific journals in probability
 Timeline of probability and statistics
 Topic outline of statistics

Probability
Probability

Probability
Probability